Bessa was a town in ancient Locris, so called from its situation in a wooded glen. It is mentioned by Homer, in the Catalogue of Ships in the Iliad. It had disappeared in the time of Strabo.

Its site is unlocated.

References

Locris
Former populated places in Greece
Locations in the Iliad
Lost ancient cities and towns